L.P. Miller Comprehensive School  is a school in Nipawin, Saskatchewan. Located in north east Saskatchewan, L.P. Miller is a part of the North East School Division #200.

Its sports teams go by the name LP Miller Bears.

This school has shop classes including electrical, carpentry, mechanics, machining, drafting, automotive, and welding.  Additionally, practical and applied arts courses include computers, theatre arts and foods.

The current principal of the school is Cory Froehlich, and the vice principals are Nicole Stadnek and Kevin Stene.

References

External links

New teachers in Nipawin - Nipawin Journal

High schools in Saskatchewan
Educational institutions established in 1969
1969 establishments in Saskatchewan